Kazhi Gewog (Dzongkha: ཀ་གཞི་) is a gewog (village block) of Wangdue Phodrang District, Bhutan.

References 

Gewogs of Bhutan
Wangdue Phodrang District